Chauveau is a provincial electoral district in the Capitale-Nationale region of Quebec, Canada.  It includes portions of the Charlesbourg and La Haute-Saint-Charles  boroughs of Quebec City and the eastern portion of the La Jacques-Cartier Regional County Municipality.

It was created for the 1966 election from part of Québec-Comté electoral district.

In the change from the 2001 to the 2011 electoral map, it lost Saint-Gabriel-de-Valcartier to La Peltrie and the unorganized territory of Lac-Jacques-Cartier to Charlevoix–Côte-de-Beaupré.

In the change from the 2011 to the 2018 electoral map, the riding will lose some territory (roughly the area between Rivère des Roches to Rue George-Muir) to Charlesbourg.

It is named after the first Premier of Quebec, Pierre-Joseph-Olivier Chauveau who was in power from 1867 to 1873.

Members of the Legislative Assembly / National Assembly

Election results

^ Change is from redistributed results. CAQ change is from ADQ.

|-

|Liberal
|Sarah Perreault
|align="right"|8,849
|align="right"|22.35
|align="right"|-17.75
|-

|-

|}
* Increase is from UFP

|-

|Liberal
|Sarah Perreault
|align="right"|14,774
|align="right"|40.10
|align="right"|+2.76

|-

|-

|No designation
|Christian Légaré
|align="right"|624
|align="right"|1.69
|align="right"|-
|-

|}

References

External links
Information
 Elections Quebec

Election results
 Election results (National Assembly)

Maps
 2011 map (PDF)
 2001 map (Flash)
2001–2011 changes (Flash)
1992–2001 changes (Flash)
 Electoral map of Capitale-Nationale region
 Quebec electoral map, 2011

Provincial electoral districts of Quebec City
Quebec provincial electoral districts